Linewatch is a 2008 American thriller film starring Cuba Gooding Jr., and directed by Kevin Bray. The film was released on direct-to-DVD in the United States on October 21, 2008.

Plot
Michael Dixon (Cuba Gooding Jr.) is an agent working linewatch for the United States Border Patrol on the U.S. Mexico Border in New Mexico. He is well-respected by his peers at US Border Patrol and loved by his wife Angela (Sharon Leal) and 5-year-old daughter Emily (Deja Warrior). Michael and his partner Luis DeSanto (Omar Paz Trujillo) discover a van full of dead illegal immigrants, and they go in search of the "coyote" who was leading them across before he left them for dead.

At the same time, Michael has to deal with a Minute Men-style militia led by Ron Spencer (Chris Browning). The search for the coyote leads Michael and Luis to a trailer, and results in a shootout where Luis gets shot.

During the ensuing chaos, Michael recognizes one of the suspects as Cook (Malieek Straughter), a member of the High Noon Gang (HNG) from Los Angeles. Years ago, Michael was a member of the HNG, until he turned on his back to the gang. The encounter along with Cook, who escapes, leads the HNG and its leader, Kimo (Omari Hardwick), to Michael.

It turns out that Michael has interfered with an HNG plot to bring drugs into the United States. Kimo threatens to kill Angela and Emily unless Mike agrees to use his Border Patrol connections to help the HNG bring in a drug shipment. Meanwhile, Michael would not able to help Kimo, but he realizes that, through the threats made against his family, that he has little choice. Michael is forced to find a way to protect his family from the High Noon Gang.

Cast
 Cuba Gooding Jr. as Michael Dixon
 Omari Hardwick as Kimo
 Evan Ross as Little Boy
 Dean Norris as Warren Kane
 Malieek Straughter as Cook
 AMG as Stokes
 Sharon Leal as Angela Dixon
 Omar Paz Trujillo as Luis
 Chris Browning as Spencer
 William Sterchi as Simon
 Francisco Fernandez as Juan
 Jimmie Romero as Vargas
 Bryan Lane as Sam King
 Dan Burkarth as Jim Barnett
 Josh J. Coffman as Bill Krott

Production
It is set and filmed in Albuquerque, New Mexico, on November 12 and December 13, 2007.

Home media
DVD was released in Region 1 in the United States on October 21, 2008, and also Region 2 in the United Kingdom on 3 November 2008, it was distributed by Sony Pictures Home Entertainment.

External links
 

2008 films
2008 direct-to-video films
2008 crime thriller films
African-American films
American crime thriller films
Sony Pictures direct-to-video films
Stage 6 Films films
Films about drugs
Films directed by Kevin Bray (director)
Films set in New Mexico
American gang films
American police detective films
2000s English-language films
2000s American films